Tindacera is a genus of flies in the family Stratiomyidae.

Species
Tindacera quadrispinosa Lindner, 1961

References

Stratiomyidae
Brachycera genera
Taxa named by Erwin Lindner
Diptera of Africa